Siwucha is an incompletely rectified vodka (raw vodka) from Poland. The name derives from the siwy (ash grey) color of the liquid due to Tyndall effect of the colloid emulsion of residual fusel oil.

History
Siwucha is one of the generic Slavic words for a moonshine. In Polish it denotes a home-brew vodka or rotgut used for its preparation. The Russian term сивуха denotes also its poor quality and is used like "fusel" in "fusel oil" (сивушные масла).

The name was first used as a vodka brand in Warsaw shortly before World War I. It was in production by various distilleries in Poland during the interbellum. After the World War II all distilleries were nationalised and its production was halted. In 1995 the Polmos distillery in Zielona Góra reintroduced it as a way to commemorate the 50th anniversary of the company's foundation.

It is sold in 0.5 litre bottles, corked and sealed with sealing wax.

Technology
The vodka is composed of a mixture of two rectified grain spirits. The mixture is then seasoned in oak barrels and a scent of forest fruit flavour is added.

References

See also
 Moonshine
 Polish moonshine
 Vodka

Polish vodkas